Alexandrovca may refer to several places in Moldova:

 Alexandrovca, a village in Plopi Commune, Cantemir district
 Alexandrovca, a village in Trifăneşti Commune, Floreşti district
 Alexandrovca, a village in Gangura Commune, Ialoveni district
 Alexandrovca, a village in Crasnîi Octeabri Commune, Transnistria
 Alexandrovca Nouă, a village in Crasnîi Vinogradari Commune, Transnistria